Krzysztof Jakubowski (born 23 September 1983) is a Polish chess Grandmaster (2009).

Chess career 
Jakubowski is a multiple medalist of the Polish Junior Chess Championship: silver in 1993 (U10), 2002 (U20), bronze in 1995 (U12), 2000 (U18), 2001 (U18).
He also won medals in the Polish Junior Team Chess Championship and Polish Junior Rapid Chess Championship. In 1999, Jakubowski won silver medal in European Youth Chess Championship (U16) in Greece.
Several times participated in the Polish Chess Championship finals. Jakubowski has also competed successfully in several Polish Team Chess Championships (individual gold in 2008, and team silver in 2000, 2001). In 2001, he won Swiss-system tournament in Avilés. In 2005, he won B tournament in Gausdal. In 2006, he won tournament in Brno. In 2014, he shared second place (with Andrey Vovk, behind Aleksander Miśta) in Banca Feroviara Open in Arad.

References

External links 

1983 births
Polish chess players
Chess grandmasters
Living people